The Versions is the sixth studio album by Neneh Cherry, released on 10 June 2022 via EMI Records. The album consists of reworked versions of songs from Cherry's back catalogue, featuring guest appearances by artists including Robyn and Sia.

Track listing

Personnel

Musicians 
 Neneh Cherry – vocals (10)
 Mapei – vocals (1)
 Robyn – vocals (1)
 Sia – vocals (2)
 Anohni – vocals (3)
 Greentea Peng – vocals (4)
 Jamila Woods – vocals (5)
 Justin Canavan – guitar (5)
 Tyson – vocals (6)
 Femi Koleoso – drums (6)
 Jordan Hadfield – bass, guitar (6)
 Sarah Tandy – keyboards (6)
 Sudan Archives – violin, vocals (7)
 Quran Shaheed – piano (7)
 Seinabo Sey – vocals (8)
 Kelsey Lu – vocals (9)

Production 
 Neneh Cherry – programming (1-9)
 Joe LaPorta – mastering engineer (1-4, 6-9)
 Mikaelin "Blue" Bluespruce – mixing engineer (1, 4, 6, 8, 9)
 Robyn – synthesizer programming, vocal production (1)
 Ludvig Larsson – engineering (1)
 Michel Zitron – engineering, vocal production (1)
 Jesse Shatkin – mixing engineer (2)
 Samuel Dent – assistant recording engineer (2)
 Anohni – mixing engineer (3)
 Thomas Bartlett – mixing engineer (3)
 Earbuds – engineering (4)
 Matt Hennessey – mastering engineer, mixing engineer (5)
 Rick Fritz – engineering (5)
 Ty Caughell – assistant mixing engineer (5)
 Riccardo Damian – engineering (6)
 Hugh Fothergill – assistant recording engineer (6)
 Sudan Archives – programming, engineering (7)
 Tom Carmichael – mixing engineer (7)
 Academics – engineering (8)
 Kiukl Adelbai – engineering (9)
 Patrick Wimberly – engineering (9)
 Honey Dijon – remixing (10)

References

2022 albums
EMI Records albums
Hip hop albums by Swedish artists
Neneh Cherry albums
Pop albums by Swedish artists